Lakewood is an unincorporated community in Lakewood Township, Shelby County, Illinois, United States. Lakewood had a post office, which opened on July 26, 1872, and closed on November 2, 2002.

References

Unincorporated communities in Shelby County, Illinois
Unincorporated communities in Illinois
Populated places established in 1872
1872 establishments in Illinois